Goodyera umbrosa, commonly known as the native jade orchid or green jewel orchid, is a species of orchid that is endemic to northern Queensland where it grows in highland rainforest. It has between four and eight large, egg-shaped leaves and up to ten small pale green or pinkish flowers with the dorsal sepal and petals forming a hood over the column.

Description 
The lateral sepals and petals are a similar size to the dorsal sepal with the lateral sepals spreading downwards. Flowering occurs from June to August.

Taxonomy and naming
The native jade orchid was first formally described in 2004 by David Jones and Mark Clements who gave it the name Eucosia umbrosa and published the description in The Orchadian. In 2014, Julian Shaw changed the name to Goodyera umbrosa. The specific epithet (umbrosa) is a Latin word meaning "shaded".

Distribution and habitat
Goodyera umbrosa usually grows in leaf litter and in rock crevices in rainforest between Mount Finnigan in Cedar Bay National Park and Mount Fox near Ingham.

Gallery

References

Orchids of Queensland
Endemic orchids of Australia
Plants described in 2004
umbrosa